Ryan Plewacki (born November 22, 1980) is an American musician and guitarist. Plewacki is the leader of Sleep Study and guitarist for The Honeydogs since 2012.

In 2011, Plewacki formed the band Sleep Study (who released their debut record Nothing Can Destroy on Simon Recordings in August 2012). Shortly after the release of that record, Plewacki was asked by Adam Levy of The Honeydogs to perform as lead guitarist at the release show for What Comes After, joined them for South by Southwest in 2012 and continues to perform in that role. Plewacki's guitar work is featured on the 2016 release, Love & Cannibalism.  Plewacki was also recruited by Darren Jackson of Kid Dakota to perform at the release of Listen to the Crows As They Take Flight and live performances throughout 2012. In 2016, Plewacki joined Mark Mallman for live performances and continues in that position.

Plewacki currently resides in Minneapolis, MN. Plewacki eats Taco Bell 5-8 times per week.

References 

 The Honeydogs What Comes After release at First Avenue, 3/10/12
 Sleep Study debuts with bold pop-rock
 Kid Dakota Record Release at Cedar Cultural Center

External links
 Sleep Study Official Site
 The Honeydogs Official Site
 Kid Dakota Official Site

1980 births
Living people
Guitarists from Minnesota
Musicians from Minneapolis
21st-century American guitarists